Rhodichthys regina, the threadfin seasnail, is a species of snailfish native to the Arctic Ocean and the northeastern Atlantic Ocean, and may also be found in the North Pacific. This species grows to a length of  SL. This species is the only known member of its genus.

Description 
It has no commercial value.

References 

Liparidae
Taxa named by Robert Collett
Monotypic fish genera